Benjamin Saunders is a British-born academic and Program Director of the Comics and Cartoon Studies minor  at the University of Oregon in Eugene, Oregon. He holds a Ph.D in English Literature from Duke University, a Masters in Philosophy in English Renaissance Literature from University of Cambridge and a Batchelor of the Arts degree with First Class Honors from the University of East Anglia.

Career 
Along with teaching English and courses in Comics Studies at the University of Oregon, Saunders is the author of books discussing John Donne, music, the artist Jack Kirby, and the appeal of comic book heroes.

He has traveled globally lecture as an authority on the history of comic books, and is the curator of multiple museum exhibitions on comic art and popular culture. His most recent exhibition, Marvel: Universe of Super Heroes currently at the Museum of Pop Culture in Seattle, Washington, showcases the history and impact of Marvel Comics on the world of entertainment. Saunders also served as a judge for the 2012 Eisner Awards for nominees published in 2011 and has appeared in the 2017 History Channel documentary, Superheroes Decoded.

Bibliography 

 Comic Book Apocalypse: The Graphic World of Jack Kirby (co-edited with Charles Hatfield) (2016)
 Do The Gods Wear Capes: Spirituality, Fantasy, and Superheroes (2011)
 Desiring Donne: Poetry, Sexuality, Interpretation (2006)
 Rock Over the Edge: Transformations in Popular Music Culture (co-edited with Denise Fulbrook and Roger Beebe) (2002)
 Penguin Classics Marvel Collection Series (Series Editor, Series Introductions) (2022)

Museum exhibit curation 

 Faster Than A Speeding Bullet: The Art of the Superhero, Jordan Schnitzer Museum of Art, Eugene, Oregon, 2009
 Good Grief! A Selection of Original Art From Fifty Years of Charles M Schulz’s Peanuts, Jordan Schnitzer Museum of Art, Eugene, Oregon, 2012
 Aliens, Monsters, and Madmen: The Art of EC Comics, Jordan Schnitzer Museum of Art, Eugene, Oregon, 2016
 Marvel: Universe of Super Heroes, Museum of Pop Culture, Seattle, Washington, 2018
 Spider-Man: Beyond Amazing - The Exhibition, Comic-Con Museum, San Diego, California, 2022

References 

Duke University alumni
Living people
University of Oregon faculty
Writers from Cardiff
1968 births
Alumni of the University of Cambridge
Alumni of the University of East Anglia